The Rural Municipality of Greenfield No. 529 was a rural municipality (RM) in Saskatchewan. It was originally formed as the RM of Bright Sand No. 529 before changing its name to the RM of Greenfield No. 529 on February 2, 1926. Greenfield No. 529 was dissolved on June 1, 1990.  It was absorbed by the RM of Mervin No. 499.

References

External links 
Saskatchewan Association of Rural Municipalities

Greenfield No. 529

Division No. 17, Saskatchewan